Like all municipalities of Puerto Rico, Patillas is subdivided into administrative units called barrios, which are roughly comparable to minor civil divisions. The barrios and subbarrios, in turn, are further subdivided into smaller local populated place areas/units called sectores (sectors in English). The types of sectores may vary, from normally sector to urbanización to reparto to barriada to residencial, among others. Some sectors appear in two barrios.

List of sectors by barrio

Apeadero
Carretera 757
Sector Acueducto
Sector Amill
Sector Campos
Sector Carrión
Sector Estrada
Sector Justo Rosa
Sector La Loma Final
Sector Los Morales
Sector Machuchal
Sector Russi

Bajo
Calle El Fuego
Carretera 3
Sector Barro Blanco
Sector Villa Marina
Sector Villa Pesquera
Urbanización Solimar

Cacao Alto
There are no sectors in Cacao Alto barrio.

Cacao Bajo
Carretera 3
Carretera 184
Carretera 755
Sector Ancones Sifón
Sector La Herradura
Sector Los Pompos
Sector Margote
Sector Obén
Sector Raja Larga
Sector Sabana
Sector Seboruco
Sector Túnel Sabana
Sector Yaurel Chiquito
Urbanización Estancias de Aurora
Urbanización Las Violetas

Egozcue
Carretera 181
Carretera 7759
Sector Betancourt
Sector Calanse
Sector Campusu
Sector Cuatro Calles
Sector El Coquí
Sector Guaraguao
Sector Huertas
Sector Pedragón

Guardarraya
Calle Buena Vista
Calle Ceiba
Calle Monte Mar
Calle Monte
Calle Vista Alegre
Calle Vista Horizonte
Calle Vista Mar
Calle Vista Monte
Carretera 3
Carretera 7758
Centro Cooperativo
Comunidad Guardarraya
Sector Cofresí
Sector La Mina
Sector Mala Pascua
Sector Recio
Sector San Bartolo
Sector Tamarindo

Jacaboa
Calle El Fuego
Carretera 3
Carretera 758
Sector Barro Blanco
Sector Higuero (Carretera 7755)
Sector Lamboglia
Sector Malagueta
Sector Mercado
Sector Merle
Sector Palenque
Sector Villa Marina
Sector Villa Pesquera
Solares Dr. Dávila
Urbanización Portales de Jacaboa
Urbanización Solimar

Jagual
Carretera 184
Sector Caimito
Sector Charco La Huerta
Sector El Conejo Blanco
Sector La Cuesta del Cuco
Sector La Luna
Sector La Playita
Sector La Prá
Sector Lebrón
Sector Puerca Prieta
Sector Represa
Sector Suro
Sector Vietnam

Mamey
Carretera 757
Condominios Buenos Aires
Égida Del Bosque
Sector La Cuchilla
Sector Limones
Sector Loma del Viento
Sector Río Chico
Sector Santo Domingo
Sector Vietnam
Urbanización Valle Verde
Urbanización Villa Esperanza
Urbanización Villas de Jerusalén

Marín
Calle Jesús T. Piñero
Carretera 181
Carretera 799
Condominios Patillas
Condominios Santana
Residencial Esmeralda del Sur
Residencial Villa Real
Salida hacia Marín
Sector Campito Los Soto
Sector Isidro Ruíz
Sector La Felícita
Sector La Línea
Sector La Patilla
Sector Los Barros
Sector Los Tres Puntos
Sector Mamey Chiquito
Sector Marín Alto
Sector Marín Bajo
Sector Matadero
Urbanización Brisas de la Esmeralda
Urbanización El Paraíso
Urbanización Remanso
Urbanización San José
Urbanización Valle Alto
Urbanización Valles de Patillas

Mulas
Carretera 184
Carretera 754
Sector Anón
Sector Icaco
Sector Las Delicias
Sector Neris
Sector Pueblito
Sector Sofía

Muñoz Rivera
Carretera 179
Carretera 184
Sector El Campamento Real
Sector Los Tres Chorros
Sector Miraflores
Sector Palma Sola
Sector Real
Sector Riachuelo
Sector Río Arriba
Sector Sonadora

Patillas barrio-pueblo
Residencial Villa del Caribe
Urbanización Jardines de Patillas
Urbanización Jardines del Mamey
Urbanización Joseira
Urbanización Mariani
Urbanización Melissa
Urbanización Parque del Sol
Urbanización San Benito
Urbanización San Martín
Urbanización Villas de Patillas

Pollos
Calle Acueducto
Calle Alberto Ricci
Calle Canario
Calle Cerezos
Calle Cristo
Calle Culto
Calle El Hoyo
Calle Félix Portugués
Calle Flamboyán
Calle Francisco Ortiz Lebrón
Calle Guillermo Riefkhol
Calle Helechos
Calle Iglesia
Calle Jesús T. Piñero
Calle Las Flores
Calle Las Rosas
Calle Luna
Calle Margarita
Calle Muñoz Rivera
Calle Octavio Rivera
Calle Recreo
Calle Reymundo Fernández
Calle Robles
Calle Salsipuedes
Calle Santiago Iglesias
Calle Tamarindo
Calle Yarino
Carretera 3
Carretera 757
Carretera 7757
Parcelas Nuevas
Parcelas Viejas (Calles 1, 2, 3, 4)
Sector Caguitas
Sector La Ceiba
Sector La Luna
Sector La Plo
Sector Mariani
Sector Providencia
Sector Pueblito Nuevo
Sector Tres Puertas
Urbanización Montecielo
Urbanización Valle de la Providencia

Quebrada Arriba
Carretera 184
Carretera 762
Sector Fondo del Saco
Sector Las Parcelas
Sector Los Cafeítos

Ríos
Carretera 184
Carretera 758
Carretera 762
Sector Avispas
Sector Fondo del Saco
Sector Las Parcelas
Sector Los Cafeítos
Sector Los Morales
Sector Los Ríos

See also

 List of communities in Puerto Rico

References

Patillas
Patillas